Welf III (13 November 1055), the last male member of the Swabian line of the Elder House of Welf, was Duke of Carinthia and Margrave of Verona from 1047 until his death.

Life
Welf III was the only son of the Swabian count Welf II of Altdorf (died 1030) and Imiza, a daughter of Count Frederick of Luxembourg and niece of the later empress Cunigunde of Luxembourg. His sister Kunigunde of Altdorf (1054) married Margrave Albert Azzo II, of Milan, a member of the Italian House of Este, and became the ancestor of the House of Welf-Este of (Younger) House of Welf.

Upon the death of his father, Welf III succeeded him in the family's extended estates in Swabia and Bavaria. Through the intervention of his aunt, Richlind of Altdorf, he also inherited the property of her late husband Count Adalbero II of Ebersberg in 1045. Probably through his mother, Imiza's, intervention Emperor Henry III enfeoffed Welf in 1047 with the Duchy of Carinthia and the adjacent March of Verona, which after the death of Duke Conrad the Younger in 1039 both had been held personally by the Salian emperor.

Together with Duke Bretislaus I of Bohemia, Welf accompanied Emperor Henry III on his 1051 campaign against King Andrew I of Hungary. Later however, he turned against the emperor and got involved in a conspiracy around the deposed Duke Conrad I of Bavaria, who with Hungarian support raided the Carinthian March of Styria. A plot to assassinate Henry failed, when Duke Welf became confined to his sickbed and revealed the plans.

Welf III never married and had no children when he died at his castle in Bodman on Lake Constance on 13 November 1055. He bequeathed his property to Weingarten Abbey in Altdorf, where his mother was abbess. She in turn gave the property to Duke Welf I of Bavaria, the son of Welf III's sister Kunigunde and Margrave Albert Azzo II of Milan.

Welf III was the last male heir of the Elder Welfs, his patrimonial lands went to the senior branch of the House of Este and the Younger House of Welf. In 1057 Emperor Henry's widow Agnes of Poitou ceded the Carinthian duchy to the Ezzonid scion Conrad III. Welf was buried at Weingarten Abbey.

Notes

References
E. Steindorff, Jahrbücher des Deutschen Reichs unter Heinrich III., 2 vols. (Leipzig, 1874–1881), accessible online at: archive.org
B. Schneidmüller, Die Welfen. Herrschaft und Erinnerung (819–1252). (Stuttgart, 2000)
H. Dopsch, 'Welf III und Kärnten' in D. Bauer, et al., eds., Welf IV. - Schlüsselfigur einer Wendezeit: Regionale und europäische Perspektiven (Munich, 2004), pp. 84–128.
K. Jordan, Heinrich der Löwe (Deutscher Taschenbuch Verlag 1993).
H. Renn, Das erste Luxemburger Grafenhaus (963-1136) (Bonn, 1941).
K-E. Klaar, Die Herrschaft der Eppensteiner in Kärnten
W. Störmer, 'Die Welfen in der Reichspolitik des 11. Jahrhunderts,' Mitteilungen des Instituts für Österreichische Geschichtsforschung 104 (1996), 252–265.

External links
Medieval Lands Project
Welf III, Herzog von Kärnten (in German)

11th-century births
1055 deaths
Dukes of Carinthia
Elder House of Welf
Year of birth unknown